Phlegmacium boreidionysae is a species of fungus in the family Cortinariaceae.

Taxonomy 
It was originally described in 2014 by the mycologists Ilkka Kytövuori, Kare Liimatainen, Tuula Niskanen, and Balint Dima who classified it as Cortinarius boreidionysae. It was placed in the (subgenus Phlegmacium) of the large mushroom genus Cortinarius.

In 2022 the species was transferred from Cortinarius and reclassified as Phlegmacium boreidionysae based on genomic data.

Etymology 
The specific epithet boreidionysae refers to its close relationship to C. dionysae, and its boreal distribution.

Habitat and distribution 
Found in Finland, it grows in northern boreal forests of predominantly Norway spruce (Picea abies).

See also
List of Cortinarius species

References

External links

boreidionysae
Fungi described in 2014
Fungi of Finland